Hawk Hill is a  peak in the Marin Headlands, just north of the Golden Gate Bridge and across the Golden Gate strait from San Francisco, California.  The hill is within the Golden Gate National Recreation Area.

It is the lookout point for the largest known flight of diurnal raptors in the Pacific states. Each autumn, from August into December, tens of thousands of hawks, kites, falcons, eagles, vultures, osprey, and harriers are funneled by the peninsular shape of Marin County into the headlands. Hawks avoid flight over water since warm thermals that provide lift are rare. Abundant populations of small mammals protected by the park are one resource that helps maintain the large number of visiting raptors in the Headlands during the fall, but the strong onshore winds hitting the hills of the Headlands provide cold updrafts and hot late summer days provide warm thermals that allow these birds to fly more efficiently.

Volunteers with the Golden Gate Raptor Observatory count and track this fall migration using bird-banding and radio-tracking techniques, all in cooperation with the National Park Service.

Raptor observations 

The following table lists the annual average number of sightings by the GGRO in the Marin Headlands during autumn, for the years 2001–2009.

External links 
 Directions to Hawk Hill

References 

Hills of California
Landforms of Marin County, California
Golden Gate National Recreation Area
Raptor migration sites
Landforms of the San Francisco Bay Area